The Thatcher CX5 is an American homebuilt aircraft that was designed by Dave Thatcher.

Development
The CX5 is a two place, all metal, low-wing, tricycle gear-equipped aircraft. The prototype aircraft is outfitted with a Revmaster R-2300. The wings have upturned outer sections for dihedral.

Specifications (CX5)

See also

References

Homebuilt aircraft